Lowdown is an Australian television comedy series set in the world of celebrity journalism. Created by Amanda Brotchie and Adam Zwar, it stars Zwar, Paul Denny, Beth Buchanan, Dailan Evans, Kim Gyngell and is narrated by Geoffrey Rush. The ABC series premiered on 21 April 2010 and is produced by Nicole Minchin and directed by Amanda Brotchie.

Cast
Adam Zwar as Alex Burchill
Paul Denny as Bob Geraghty
Beth Buchanan as Rita Heywood
Dailan Evans as Dr James Sawers
Kim Gyngell as Howard Evans
Geoffrey Rush as Narrator
Anna Jennings-Edquist as Sharna
Ashley Zukerman as Dylan Hunt
Julia Zemiro as Hope van der Boom
Rebecca Massey as Trudy
Cindy Waddingham as Andrea
Antony Starr as Stuart King
Amanda Brotchie as Susan

Series Overview
The first series consisted of eight episodes and premiered on 21 April 2010 and ended its first-run on 9 June 2010. A spokesperson for the series, stated in a reply on the 'Letters to the Editor' section on the online website "I know the creators personally and they promise me they’re onto developing a second season." A second series of eight episodes was broadcast from 6 September 2012 to 25 October 2012.

Episodes

Series 1 (2010)

Series 2 (2012)

Australian ratings

Awards

Awards won

'Australian Academy of Cinema and Television Arts
AACTA Award for Best Television Comedy Series - Lowdown Season 2 Amanda Brotchie, Nicole Minchin and Adam Zwar (2013)
New York Festivals Awards
Gold World Medal for Best Comedy - Lowdown Season 2 (2013)
Gold World Medal for Best Situation Comedy - Lowdown (2011)
Australian Writers' Guild Awards
 AWGIE Award for Best Comedy (Situation or Narrative) - Lowdown Season 2. Episode 3, "One Fine Gay" - Amanda Brotchie, Trudy Hellier and Adam Zwar (2012)
 AWGIE Award for Best Comedy (Situation or Narrative) - Lowdown Episode 7, "Who's Your Baddy?" -  Amanda Brotchie and Adam Zwar (2010)
Screen Producers Association of Australia
Breakthrough Producer of the Year Award - Lowdown Nicole Minchin (2010) Accolade Competition
Accolade Awards
 Award for Excellence in Comedy - Lowdown (2011)
 International Award for Excellence for Leading Actor - Adam Zwar (2011)
 International Award of Merit in Direction - Amanda Brotchie (2011)

Award nominations
Monte-Carlo Television Festival
Golden Nymph Award for Best International Comedy Series - Lowdown (2013)
Golden Nymph Award for Outstanding Actor in a Comedy Series - Adam Zwar (2013)
Golden Nymph Award for Outstanding Actress in a Comedy Series - Beth Buchanan (2013)

Australian Academy of Cinema and Television Arts
AACTA Award for Best Screenplay in Television - Lowdown Season 2. Episode 3, "One Fine Gay" - Amanda Brotchie, Adam Zwar, Trudy Hellier (2013)

Australian Film Institute Awards
 AFI Award for Best Television Comedy Series - Lowdown (2010)
 AFI Award for Best Performance in a Television Comedy - Paul Denny (2010)

Australian Directors Guild Awards
 Best Direction in Television Comedy - Amanda Brotchie (2010)

See also
List of Australian television series
List of Australian Broadcasting Corporation programs

References

External links
Lowdown (official website) ABC.net.au

2010 Australian television series debuts
2010 Australian television series endings
Australian Broadcasting Corporation original programming
Australian comedy television series